Abrantes Futebol Clube is a Portuguese football club from Abrantes. The team plays in the Second Division – Serie D.

The club was created on 14 December 1998 and was later dissolved.

Appearances

II Divisão B: 4
III Divisão: 1

League and cup history

Honours

Campeão Distrital de Santarém da 2ª Divisão: 1
Campeão Distrital de Santarém da 1ª Divisão: 1
Winner of Taça do Ribatejo
Winner of  Supertaça Dr. Alves Vieira'

Older uniforms

Sponsors and manufacturer

Sponsors include Ajibira, the Municipality of Abrantes and Eurosol, its manufacturer was SOK.

External links
 Abrantes FC official site (Portuguese)

Football clubs in Portugal
Association football clubs established in 1998
1998 establishments in Portugal